RCC Broadcasting Company (株式会社中国放送 Kabushiki Gaisha Chugoku Hoso; later name: RCC) is a Japanese broadcaster which serves the Hiroshima region. It is a member of JRN and NRN networks for radio and JNN for television.

History

Early history 
Alongside the planned expansion of private broadcasting across Japan after the passage of the "Three Radio Laws" in 1950, two companies, "Hiroshima Heiwa Broadcasting" and "Radio Hiroshima" applied for the establishment of private radio stations. Later, the two companies merged after the Radio Supervisory Committee's advice. On April 21, 1951, Hiroshima Broadcasting (the new company after two companies merged) was granted a license and on February 25 the following year, they held the promoters' meeting and received funding from newspapers Asahi Shimbun and Mainichi Shimbun.

On August 8, 1952, Hiroshima Broadcasting was renamed to Radio Chugoku after a general meeting of shareholders. Radio Chugoku started broadcasting on October 1, 1952, at 6:30 am operating for at least 16 hours and 30 minutes every day.

Expansion to TV broadcasting and further developments 
In 1954, Radio Chugoku applied for a TV license, and received a preliminary TV license on October 22, 1957. On March 17, 1959, Radio Chugoku began TV broadcast trials. Radio Chugoku started TV broadcasts on April 1, 1959 Also in the same year, it joined the Japan News Network. 

During its early operations, the broadcaster didn't have any professional TV studios which resulted its radio studio being multipurposed for TV broadcasts. It was then decided that a new headquarters will be built in Motomachi (which started on November 5, 1960), adjacent to the Hiroshima Castle. On October 19, 1960, Radio Chugoku started broadcasting on its newly built headquarters.

On March 20, 1966, Chugoku Radio and Television began TV broadcasting in color. On April 1 of the same year, it started uninterrupted TV broadcasts. The company was then renamed to Chugoku Broadcasting on April 1, 1967 to reflect its TV and radio operations.

Since the mid-60s, RCC produced documentaries with foreign productions. These include a documentary about Japanese immigrants in Hawaii in 1965 and about Hiroshima City and Volgograd becoming sister cities in 1968.

On April 15, 1970, RCC started broadcasting professional baseball games in color for the first time. Chugoku Broadcasting became an official broadcaster for airing highlights of the Hiroshima Flower Festival since it started in 1977. 

On October 1, 2006, RCC started digital broadcasting and ended analog broadcasts on July 24, 2011.

Network

TV 
 Japan News Network (JNN) and TBS Network

Radio 
 Japan Radio Network (JRN)
 National Radio Network (NRN)

Station list

TV 
Analog
 Hiroshima JOER-TV 4CH
 Onomichi JOEE-TV 10CH
 Fukuyama 7CH
 Miyoshi, Kure, Higashihiroshima-Saijo 9CH
 Higashihiroshima-Kurose 60CH
Digital (Button 3)
 Hiroshima JOER-DTV 18CH
 Kure 18CH
 Fukuyama 16CH

AM Radio 
 Stereo
 Hiroshima JOER 1350 kHz 50 kW
 Monaural
 Fukuyama JOEO 1530 kHz 1 kW
 Shobara 1458 kHz 1 kW
 Mihara 1530 kHz 100 W
 Fuchu 1530 kHz 100 W
 Miyoshi 1458 kHz 100 W
 Tojo 1458 kHz 100 W

FM Radio 
 Hiroshima 94.6 MHz FM

References

External links
 HOMEPAGE
 Company Info
 RCC Television
 RCC Radio

Mass media in Hiroshima
Companies based in Hiroshima
Japan News Network
Television stations in Japan
Radio in Japan
Television channels and stations established in 1959
Radio stations established in 1952
Television channels and stations disestablished in 2011